Clyde Elliot Cumberbatch (13 November 1936 – 29 December 2017) was a cricket umpire from Trinidad and Tobago who stood in twelve Test matches, all involving the West Indies cricket team. He also umpired in 26 ODI games between 1984 and 1997.

Umpiring career
Cumberbatch made his debut at first-class and List A in 1979. He reached Test cricket level in 1981.

See also
 List of Test cricket umpires
 List of One Day International cricket umpires

References

1936 births
2017 deaths
Sportspeople from Port of Spain
Trinidad and Tobago cricket umpires
West Indian Test cricket umpires
West Indian One Day International cricket umpires